Cynicism is an attitude characterized by a general distrust of the motives of others. A cynic may have a general lack of faith or hope in people motivated by ambition, desire, greed, gratification, materialism, goals, and opinions that a cynic perceives as vain, unobtainable, or ultimately meaningless. The term originally derives from the ancient Greek philosophers, the Cynics, who rejected conventional goals of wealth, power, and honor.  They practiced shameless nonconformity with social norms in religion, manners, housing, dress, or decency, instead advocating the pursuit of virtue in accordance with a simple and natural way of life.

By the 19th century, emphasis on the ascetic ideals and the critique of current civilization based on how it might fall short of an ideal civilization or negativistic aspects of Cynic philosophy led the modern understanding of cynicism to mean a disposition of disbelief in the sincerity or goodness of human motives and actions. Modern cynicism is a distrust toward professed ethical and social values, especially when there are high expectations concerning society, institutions, and authorities that are unfulfilled. It can manifest itself as a result of frustration, disillusionment, and distrust perceived as owing to organizations, authorities, and other aspects of society. 

Cynicism is often confused with pessimism or nihilism, perhaps due to its distrust in others. The differences between the three is that cynicism is a distrust by prudence; while due to a sense of defeatism, pessimism is the distrust of potential success. Nihilism on its part is the general distrust cast upon the belief that anything in life (including life itself) has any valuable meaning.

Overview
Modern cynicism has been defined as an attitude of distrust toward claimed ethical and social values and a rejection of the need to be socially involved. It is pessimistic about the capacity of human beings to make correct ethical choices, and one antonym is naiveté. Modern cynicism is sometimes regarded as a product of mass society, especially in those circumstances where the individual believes there is a conflict between society's stated motives and goals and actual motives and goals.

Critical evaluation
Cynicism can appear more active in depression. In his bestselling Critique of Cynical Reason (1983), Peter Sloterdijk defined modern cynics as "borderline melancholics, who can keep their symptoms of depression under control and yet retain the ability to work, whatever might happen ... indeed, this is the essential point in modern cynicism: the ability of its bearers to work—in spite of anything that might happen."

One active aspect of cynicism involves the desire to expose hypocrisy and to point out gaps between ideals and practices. George Bernard Shaw allegedly expressed this succinctly: "The power of accurate observation is commonly called cynicism by those who don't have it".

Health effects
A study published in Neurology journal in 2014 found an association between high levels of late-life "cynical distrust" (interpreted and measured in the study in terms of hostility) and dementia. The survey included 622 people who were tested for dementia for a period of 8 years. In that period, 46 people were diagnosed with dementia. "Once researchers adjusted for other factors that could affect dementia risk, such as high blood pressure, high cholesterol and smoking, people with high levels of cynical distrust were three times more likely to develop dementia than people with low levels of cynicism. Of the 164 people with high levels of cynicism, 14 people developed dementia, compared to nine of the 212 people with low levels of cynicism."

Research has also shown that cynicism is related to feelings of disrespect. According to a study published in the Journal of Experimental Psychology: General in 2020, "everyday experiences of disrespect elevated cynical beliefs and vice versa. Moreover, cynical individuals tended to treat others with disrespect, which in turn predicted more disrespectful treatment by others."

In politics

In a 1996 paper, J. N. Cappella and K. H. Jamieson claimed that "healthy skepticism may have given way to corrosive cynicism". Cynicism regarding government or politics can logically lead to political withdrawal and effective political helplessness. In 2013 conservative politician and political theorist William J. Bennett warned that America could "crumble from within; that we would become cynical and withdraw".

Possible effects
A 2004 experiment and paper called The Effects of Strategic News on Political Cynicism, Issue Evaluations, and Policy Support: A Two-Wave Experiment  found that the way the news media presents the news can cause political cynicism. The experiment also demonstrated "a negative relation between efficacy and cynicism suggesting that efficacious citizens were less likely to be cynical about politics". It was found that straight dry, "issues-based" news did not cause political cynicism, but that "Strategic News" and "game news"  did. The latter two types of news presentation emphasize:

Social cynicism
Social cynicism results from high expectations concerning society, institutions and authorities; unfulfilled expectations lead to disillusionment, which releases feelings of disappointment and betrayal.

In organizations, cynicism manifests itself as a general or specific attitude, characterized by frustration, hopelessness, disillusionment and distrust in regard to economic or governmental organizations, managers or other aspects of work.

See also

Doubt
Fanaticism
Human nature
Melancholia
Misanthropy
Moral realism
Nihilism
"No good deed goes unpunished"
Pessimism
Pragmatism
Resentment
Rational choice theory
Skepticism
Weltschmerz

References

Further reading
Mazella, David, (2007), The Making of Modern Cynicism, University of Virginia Press. 
Sloterdijk, Peter, (1988), Critique of Cynical Reason, University of Minnesota Press.

External links

The Cynic's Sanctuary
The Cynical Web Site
Cynicism / Conspiracism  from Project Worldview
"Is it worse to be cynical or jaded?" Retrieved 2008-05-30

 
Belief
Normative ethics
Modernism
Psychological attitude
Social theories